Stephensia abbreviatella is a moth of the family Elachistidae. It is found in France, Germany, Poland, the Czech Republic, Slovakia, Austria, Romania and Turkey.

The wingspan is 9–11 mm.

The larvae feed on wood forget-me-not (Myosotis sylvatica). They mine the leaves of their host plant. The mine starts in a low leaf and has the form of a short, lower-surface corridor that quickly widens into a full depth, transparent blotch. Some silk is deposited in the mine. Before hibernation, the larvae make a new mine, consisting of a fairly broad corridor along the midrib, lined with silk. After overwintering, the larvae make several new mines. Pupation takes place outside of the mine, in the soil. Larvae can be found from September to May of the following year.

References

External links
 lepiforum.de

Elachistidae
Leaf miners
Moths described in 1851
Moths of Europe
Moths of Asia
Taxa named by Henry Tibbats Stainton